Oxynoemacheilus theophilii is a species of stone loach native to Turkey and the island of Lesbos in Greece.  This species occurs in streams and reaches a length of  SL. It is found in the Büyük Menderes River and other streams in western Anatolia, Turkey, and the Evergetoulas Stream on the island of Lesbos, Greece. It can be found in the upper reaches of streams with clear, cold, flowing water where it hides among the stones of the stream bed. The stomach contents of a single female were found to consist of aquatic insect larvae. Water abstraction and the increased droughts caused by climate change are the main threats.

The fish is named in honor of Theophilus Chatzimichael (1873-1934), a prominent folk painter from the island of Lesbos in Greece, where the fish is endemic.

References 

theophilii
Taxa named by Maurice Kottelat
Fish described in 2006